San Carlos is a western department of Mendoza Province in Argentina.

Districts

Chilecito
Eugenio Bustos
La Consulta
Pareditas
San Carlos

External links
Mendoza Travel Site (Spanish)

Departments of Mendoza Province
States and territories established in 1772